No. 10 is a painting by the Jewish-American Abstract expressionist artist Mark Rothko. It was painted in 1958.

In common with Rothko's other works from this period, No 10 consists of large expanses of colour delineated by uneven, hazy shades.

2015 sale
It was bought for  $82 million by an anonymous buyer, at Christie's.

See also
 List of most expensive paintings

Notes

Sources
Baal-Teshuva, Jacob. Rothko. Berlin: Taschen, 2003.   

1958 paintings
Paintings by Mark Rothko